Ivan Vladimirovich Yenin (born 6 February 1994) is a Russian professional footballer who plays as a midfielder. He plays for FC Torpedo Moscow.

Club career
With Riga, Yenin won the 2018 Virslīga and the 2018 Latvian Cup, while in the 2018–19 Bosnian Cup season with Široki, he finished as a runner-up, losing to Sarajevo in the final.

He made his debut in the Russian Football National League for FC Torpedo Moscow on 10 July 2021 in a game against FC Kuban Krasnodar. Yenin made his Russian Premier League debut for Torpedo on 17 July 2022 against PFC Sochi.

Honours
Torpedo Moscow
 Russian Football National League : 2021-22

Career statistics

References

External links

1994 births
Sportspeople from Kherson
Living people
Russian footballers
Association football midfielders
FC Vityaz Podolsk players
Riga FC players
NK Široki Brijeg players
HŠK Zrinjski Mostar players
FC Torpedo Moscow players
Russian Second League players
Latvian Higher League players
Premier League of Bosnia and Herzegovina players
Russian First League players
Russian Premier League players
Russian expatriate footballers
Expatriate footballers in Latvia
Russian expatriate sportspeople in Latvia
Expatriate footballers in Bosnia and Herzegovina
Russian expatriate sportspeople in Bosnia and Herzegovina